Chicago Lakeshore Hospital was a private behavioral health and addiction treatment center located in the north side of the city of Chicago, Illinois.

In 2011 the hospital was cited for poor staffing, lax oversight, and numerous reports of sexual assault. Chicago Lakeshore Hospital opened its children's psychiatric center in 2013.

In 2018, Federal authorities announced they were pulling funding from the hospital under investigation following numerous allegations of sexual abuse, assault and patient safety violations. All children in state care were removed from the facility after the ACLU of Illinois took action. Later that year, the facility's Medicare agreement was terminated.

In 2020, the hospital closed, discharging its final patient after years of scrutiny. The COVID-19 pandemic was cited as the reason for the facility’s closure.

In 2021, Acadia Healthcare purchased the hospital building and announced plans to reopen it as Montrose Behavioral Health Hospital.

References

External links 
 https://www.propublica.org/article/aurora-chicago-lakeshore-hospital-federal-funding-lost-dcfs/amp
 https://chicago.suntimes.com/news/aclu-demands-removal-children-dcfs-care-aurora-chicago-lakeshore-hospital/amp/

Hospitals in Chicago
Psychiatric hospitals in Illinois
Drug and alcohol rehabilitation centers
Addiction organizations in the United States